Hoes is a Dutch surname.  Notable people with the name include:

 Abbey Hoes (born 1994), Dutch actress
 Hannah Hoes Van Buren (1783–1819), wife of U.S. President Martin Van Buren
 Isa Hoes (born 1967), Dutch actress
 L. J. Hoes (born 1990), American baseball player
 Onno Hoes (born 1961), Dutch mayor, brother of Isa

See also
 Hoe (disambiguation)
 Rudolf Höss (1900–1947), sometimes spelled Hoess, German Nazi commandant of Auschwitz concentration camp

Dutch-language surnames